Joe Goodwin Burnett (born May 15, 1948) is an American prelate of the Episcopal Church, who served as the tenth Bishop of Nebraska between 2003 and 2011.

Early life and education
Burnett was born in Jackson, Mississippi on May 15, 1948. He studied at Millsaps College, from where he graduated with a Bachelor of Arts in 1970. He also studied at the Perkins School of Theology, from where he earned a Master of Divinity in 1974, and a Doctor of Ministry in 1985.

Ordained ministry
Burnett was ordained deacon in 1974 and priest in 1975. He served as curate at St John's Church in Pascagoula, Mississippi between 1974 and 1976, and then as assistant priest at St James' Church in Jackson, Mississippi between 1976 and 1980. He became vicar of the Church of the Creator in Clinton, Mississippi in 1980, and then rector of St Peter's by the Sea in Gulfport, Mississippi in 1984. In 1991, he became rector of Trinity Church in Hattiesburg, Mississippi, a post he served in till 1999. He was then appointed Professor of Pastoral Theology at the School of Theology of the University of the South, where he remained until 2003.

Bishop
Burnett was elected Bishop of Nebraska on the first ballot on May 9, 2003, and was consecrated on September 13, 2003, at the Omaha Civic Music Hall. He was installed on the same day as the tenth bishop of the diocese in Trinity Cathedral. He retained the post until his retirement in 2011, and was appointed Assistant Bishop of Maryland on April 1, 2011.

References

Living people
1948 births
Millsaps College alumni
Perkins School of Theology alumni
Episcopal bishops of Nebraska